The Ambassador from Israel to Mauritius is Israel's foremost diplomatic representative in Mauritius.

List of ambassadors

Lior Keinan (Non-Resident, Pretoria) 2017 - 
Arye Oded 
Zvi Loker (Non-Resident, Antananarivo) 1967 - 1970

References

Mauritius
Israel